Alexia Dechaume-Balleret and Rika Hiraki were the defending champions but only Hiraki competed that year with Amy Frazier.

Frazier and Hiraki lost in the final 6–3, 4–6, 6–4 against Naoko Kijimuta and Nana Miyagi.

Seeds
Champion seeds are indicated in bold text while text in italics indicates the round in which those seeds were eliminated.

 Naoko Kijimuta /  Nana Miyagi (champions)
 Amy Frazier /  Rika Hiraki (final)
 Catherine Barclay /  Lori McNeil (first round)
 Kristine Kunce /  Corina Morariu (semifinals)

Draw

External links
 1998 Japan Open Tennis Championships Women's Doubles Draw

Doubles